Thomas Ryder Graves (1745-1828) was a clergyman in the Church of Ireland during the 18th century.

He was the elder brother of Richard Graves, Dean of Ardagh; the grandfather of Charles Graves, Bishop of Limerick, Ardfert and Aghadoe; and, the ancestor of the author Robert Graves, the playwright Clotilde Graves and writer Charles Patrick Graves. He was educated at Kilkenny College before entering Trinity College, Dublin. He was Dean of Ardfert from 1785 to 1802  when he became Dean of Connor, which office he held until 1811. His eldest son, Major-General James William Graves (1774-1845), fought at the Battle of Waterloo.

References

Deans of Ardfert
Deans of Connor
1745 births
1828 deaths